Rola El-Halabi (born in Bourjein, Lebanon, on 17 March 1985) is a professional German boxer of Lebanese origin and former quadruple world champion in the WIBF, UBF, WBF and WIBA.

She migrated to Germany with her family when she was one. In 1994 she started in kickboxing and Thai kickboxing, and in 1996 in amateur boxing. After becoming champion runner-up in kick-boxing and multiple German champion in the International Amateur Boxing, she turned professional in 2006. On 30 September 2007, Rola Bou Orm became European champion of the Women's International Boxing Federation (WIBF) in the lightweight division. In October 2008, she was honored as outstanding female athlete in Ulm. On 5 June 2009, she won the world title by WIBF and Women's International Boxing Association (WIBA) after defeating Spanish Loly Munoz.

On 1 April 2011 just before a title fight against the Bosnian Irma Adler in Berlin-Karlshorst, her stepfather and former manager Hicham El-Halabi shot her in her hand, knee and both feet, a few months after his management contract was terminated in January 2011.  He also injured two security guards before being arrested. The reason of the assault was apparently private, Hicham El-Halabi disapproving of Rola's relationship with a married man of Greek origin.

Following her injuries, she did not fight in a professional match until she was defeated by Lucia Morelli on 12 January 2013. After her defeat she switched to a higher weight class (light welterweight) and in August of the same year she won the WBF title there by defeating Dalia Vasarhelyi. A month later she defended her title successfully against Sopo Putkaradze.

Amateur record

Kickboxing and Thai kickboxing
She had 20 fights with 17 wins (8 with KO) and 3 defeats. In addition, she was:
Baden-Wuerttemberg kickboxing champion in 2001
German Champion Kickboxing 2003
Nations Cup champion kickboxing 2004
German Champion Kickboxing 2004
International German Champion Thai Boxing 2004
Kickboxing World Cup winner 2004
Vice European Champion Kickboxing 2004
Vice World Champion Kickboxing 2005

Boxing
She had 22 amateur boxing fights, with 18 victories (3 with KO), 4 losses. In 2004, she took part in the European Championship. She was also:
International Tiroler Champion 2002
Ceresit-Cup winner in 2002
Bavarian Champion 2003
International German Champion 2003
International German Champion 2004
South German Champion 2005
Dolomitencup Winner 2005
Polencup Winner 2006
International German Champion 2006

Professional boxing record

Until January 2014, she won 12 out of 13 matches (with 7 KOs):
Charlotte von Baumgarten (Germany) (technical KO in first round – 10 June 2007)
Sabrina Stegner (Germany) (KO in first round – 4 August 2007)
Galina Gumliiska (Bulgaria) (points in 10 rounds – 30 September 2007)
Borislava Goranova (Bulgaria) (points in 4 rounds – 4 December 2007)
Elisabejta Suerica (Romania) (KO in first round – 9. February 2008)
Marina Kohlgruber (Germany) (points in 10 rounds –  26 July 2008)
Eva Santa (Serbia) (KO in 5th round – 16 November 2008)
Loly Munoz (Spain) (points in 10 rounds – 5 June 2009)
Agnese Boza (Latvia) (KO in 4th round – 4 September 2009)
Mia St. John (USA) (technical KO in 5th round – 20 March 2010)
Olga Bojare (Latvia) (points in 6 rounds – 4 June 2010)
 Lucia Morelli (ITA) (PTN10 am 12 January 2013)
 Dalia Vasarhelyi (Hun) (UD am 3 August 2013)
 Sopo Putkaradze (GEO) (TKO am 7 September 2013)

Professional boxing record

References

External links
Rola Bou Orm official website
Rola Bou Orm biography on WomenBoxing website

1985 births
Living people
German women boxers
Lebanese emigrants to Germany
Sportspeople from Beirut
German female kickboxers
German people of Lebanese descent
Lightweight boxers